Alexandru Maxim (born 19 January 1986) is a Moldovan former professional footballer.

References

External links
 
 

1986 births
Living people
Moldovan footballers
Association football midfielders
Moldovan expatriate footballers
Expatriate footballers in Belarus
Expatriate footballers in Kazakhstan
FC Zimbru Chișinău players
FC Politehnica Chișinău players
FC Rapid Ghidighici players
FC Dinamo Minsk players
FC Gomel players
FC Kaisar players
FC Academia Chișinău players
Speranța Nisporeni players
FC Spicul Chișcăreni players
FC Sfîntul Gheorghe players
Moldova international footballers
Moldovan Super Liga players